

Champions

Major League Baseball
World Series: Cincinnati Reds over Boston Red Sox (4–3); Pete Rose, MVP

All-Star Game, July 15 at County Stadium: National League, 6–3; Bill Madlock and Jon Matlack, MVPs

Other champions
College World Series: Texas
Japan Series: Hankyu Braves over Hiroshima Toyo Carp (4-0-1)
Big League World Series: Taipei, Taiwan
Little League World Series: Lakewood, New Jersey
Senior League World Series: Pingtung, Taiwan
Pan American Games: Cuba over United States
Winter Leagues
1975 Caribbean Series: Vaqueros de Bayamón
Dominican Republic League: Águilas Cibaeñas
Mexican Pacific League: Naranjeros de Hermosillo
Puerto Rican League: Vaqueros de Bayamón
Venezuelan League: Tigres de Aragua

Awards and honors
Baseball Hall of Fame
Earl Averill
Bucky Harris
Billy Herman
Judy Johnson
Ralph Kiner
Most Valuable Player
Fred Lynn (AL) Boston Red Sox
Joe Morgan (NL) Cincinnati Reds
Cy Young Award
Jim Palmer (AL) Baltimore Orioles
Tom Seaver (NL) New York Mets
Rookie of the Year
Fred Lynn (AL) Boston Red Sox
John Montefusco (NL) San Francisco Giants
Gold Glove Award
George Scott (1B) (AL) 
Bobby Grich (2B) (AL) 
Brooks Robinson (3B) (AL) 
Mark Belanger (SS) (AL) 
Paul Blair (OF) (AL) 
Fred Lynn (OF) (AL) 
Joe Rudi (OF) (AL)
Thurman Munson (C) (AL) 
Jim Kaat (P) (AL)

Statistical leaders

Major League Baseball final standings

Events
The proposed sale of the Chicago White Sox presented opportunities for the Oakland Athletics. A group from Seattle was ready to purchase the White Sox and move them to Seattle. As Charlie Finley had business interests in Chicago, he was prepared to move the Athletics to Chicago. Due to his 20-year lease with the city of Oakland (to expire in 1987), Finley was blocked. In the end, White Sox owner Arthur Allyn sold to Bill Veeck, who kept the White Sox in Chicago.

January
January 16 – Harmon Killebrew is released by the Minnesota Twins. He would later sign with the Kansas City Royals.
January 22 – The New York Mets signed free agent pitcher Juan Berenguer.
January 23 – Ralph Kiner is elected to the Hall of Fame by the Baseball Writers' Association of America. He earns his HoF membership by a single vote.

February
February 3 – Billy Herman, Earl Averill and Bucky Harris are selected for the Hall of Fame by the Special Veterans Committee.
February 10 – The Special Committee on the Negro Leagues picks Judy Johnson for the Hall of Fame.
February 25 – The Baltimore Orioles trade pitcher Don Hood and first baseman Boog Powell to the Cleveland Indians in exchange for Dave Duncan and minor leaguer Alvin McGrew.

March
March 15 – The Los Angeles Dodgers sign pitcher Juan Marichal. 
March 21 – Georgia Tech shuts out Earlham, 41–0, setting an NCAA record for scoring and for winning margin.

April
April 4 – The Pittsburgh Pirates release Tony La Russa from his minor league contract with the team. 
April 8 – Hall of Fame outfielder Frank Robinson becomes the first African American man to manage a Major League Baseball team, leading the Cleveland Indians to a 5–3 victory over the New York Yankees.
 Lyman Bostock makes his MLB debut for the Minnesota Twins, getting one hit in four at bats against the Texas Rangers. Bostock's career and life would come to a tragic end three years later when he is murdered while sitting in a parked car. 
April 11 – Hank Aaron returns to Milwaukee as a member of the Milwaukee Brewers. A crowd of 48,160 fans watches Aaron drive in a run in the Brewers' 6–2  victory over the Cleveland Indians. Aaron starred for the Milwaukee Braves before the franchise moved to Atlanta for the 1966 season.
April 14 – Days after he is released by the New York Yankees, pitcher Skip Lockwood is signed by the Oakland A's. 
April 15 – In his final major league appearance, Dodgers pitcher Juan Marichal gives up six hits in 2.1 innings against the Cincinnati Reds before Rick Rhoden is brought in to relieve him. Marichal would later retire from baseball.

May
May 1 – Hank Aaron goes 4-for-4, driving in two runs in the Milwaukee Brewers' 17–3 win over the Detroit Tigers. This brings his career RBI total to 2,211, breaking Babe Ruth's published record of 2,209. On February 3, 1976, the Records Committee will revise Ruth's total to 2,204, meaning that in actuality, Aaron set the record on April 18.
May 2 – The Los Angeles Dodgers trade pitchers Eddie Solomon and Geoff Zahn to the Chicago Cubs in exchange for pitcher Burt Hooton.
May 4 :
At 5:00 AM, the New York Mets' Cleon Jones is arrested for indecent exposure in St. Petersburg, Florida after police find him naked in a van with a white, teenage girl who is holding a stash of narcotics. The charges are later dropped, however, chairman of the New York Mets M. Donald Grant fines Jones $2,000, four times as much as a Met has ever been assessed before, and forces Jones to publicly apologize during a press conference held in New York, with his wife, Angela, by his side.
The San Francisco Giants beat the Houston Astros 8–6 in the first game of a doubleheader at Candlestick Park. In the second inning, Houston's Bob Watson scores what is calculated as the major leagues' one-millionth run of all time, as Milt May hits John Montefusco's first pitch to drive him home. Meanwhile, Dave Concepción of the Cincinnati Reds hits a home run at about the same moment and races around the bases, but Watson, running from second base, scores first. Cincinnati lose to Atlanta, 3–2. (On April 22, 1876, the opening game of the National League's first-ever season, the Boston Red Caps came out ahead of the Philadelphia Athletics by the score of 6–5. Athletics first baseman Wes Fisler scored the very first run in major league history.)
May 5 – The Oakland Athletics release pinch runner Herb Washington. Washington, who played in 104 major league games without batting, pitching, or fielding, compiled 31 stolen bases and scored 33 runs.  His 1975 trading card (no. 407) is the only Topps card ever issued showing the player's position as 'pinch runner'.
May 25 :
Dennis Eckersley, in his first major league start, hurls a three-hit shutout as the Cleveland Indians beat Oakland 6–0.
Mickey Lolich's 200th career victory is a rain-shortened, 4–1 win over the Chicago White Sox. His catcher is Bill Freehan, who also caught him in his first major league start on May 21, 1963.
May 30 – Willie McCovey pinch-hits a grand slam to lift the San Diego Padres over the New York Mets, 6–2. It is McCovey's 3rd career pinch slam, tying the major league record held by Ron Northey and Rich Reese. It is also his 16th lifetime bases-loaded homer, tying the National League record held by Hank Aaron.
May 31 – César Tovar gets the only hit for Texas, the fifth time in his career he has had his team's lone hit in a game. Yankees newly acquired pitcher Catfish Hunter hurls the one-hit 6–0 victory.

June
June 1 – The Angels' Nolan Ryan pitches his fourth career no-hitter, winning 1–0 over the Orioles, to tie the record set by Sandy Koufax. Ryan's win is his career win 100th.
June 6 – Luis Tiant wins his 100th game with the Boston Red Sox, defeating Kansas City 1–0. Boston's other 100+ winners include Cy Young, Mel Parnell, Smoky Joe Wood, Joe Dobson and Lefty Grove. Carl Yastrzemski draws a walk in the game, his 1,452nd, tying him for 10th on the all-time list with Jimmie Foxx.
June 7 – The Kansas City Royals sign pitcher Dan Quisenberry as an undrafted free agent. 
June 8 – Against the Detroit Tigers at Oakland–Alameda County Coliseum, Ken Holtzman of the Oakland Athletics has a no-hitter broken up with two out in the ninth on a Tom Veryzer double, the only hit he will allow in a 4–0 Athletic victory.
June 18 – Rookie Fred Lynn drives in 10 runs with three home runs, a triple and a single during a Boston 15–1 drubbing of the Detroit Tigers. Lynn's 16 total bases tie an American League record.

July
July 2 – For the second time in less than a month, an American League pitcher has a no-hitter broken up with two out in the ninth after having pitched one in the National League. In the first game of a doubleheader at Milwaukee County Stadium, Boston Red Sox pitcher Rick Wise has the bid foiled by a George Scott two-run home run. Wise gives up another home run to Bobby Darwin one batter later, but holds on to win, 6–3. In the same game, Boston's Jim Rice hits a home run that comes within four rows of exiting the stadium.
July 4 – At Veterans Stadium, Jerry Grote steps in as a pinch hitter against longtime battery-mate Tug McGraw, who had been traded to the Philadelphia Phillies during the off-season. With the Mets down 3–2, Grote connected for a game-winning two-run home run. Without McGraw to go to in the Mets' bullpen, Rick Baldwin stepped in, and earned the save.
July 15 – At Milwaukee County Stadium, the National League rallies for three runs in the ninth inning to win the All-Star Game over the American League, 6–3. Bill Madlock and the Mets' Jon Matlack share the MVP award. The game also marks the last of Hank Aaron's record-tying (along with Stan Musial and Willie Mays) 24th All-Star appearance; he lines out to Dave Concepción as a pinch hitter in the second inning.
July 17 – For the second consecutive Chicago White Sox game, Wilbur Wood is the starter, and he tosses his second straight shutout, beating the Detroit Tigers 5–0. The two starts were separated by the All-Star game.
July 21 – Félix Millán of the New York Mets has four straight singles but is wiped out each time when Joe Torre grounds into four straight double plays, tying a major league record. New York loses 6–2 to the Houston Astros.  Torre is the first National Leaguer to do so.
July 24 – Tom Seaver fans Dan Driessen of the Reds in the second inning for his 2,000th career strikeout. The Reds win, 2–1.
July 27 :
Ron Guidry, later to be known as "Louisiana Lightning" makes his MLB debut for the New York Yankees. He pitches 2 innings, gives up 3 hits but strikes out three in relief.
 The New York Mets release Cleon Jones months after his arrest incident earlier in the year.

August
August 2 – At Shea Stadium, the New York Yankees defeat the Cleveland Indians 5–3 in Billy Martin's debut as Yankee manager. This will be the first of five stints as Yankee manager for Martin, who had played for the Yankees from – and –. Martin had replaced the fired Bill Virdon as Yankee skipper the day before. (The Yankees played at Shea Stadium for the 1974 and 1975 seasons while Yankee Stadium was being renovated.)
August 5 - Pitcher Bill Bonham of the Chicago Cubs gives up seven straight hits to the first seven batters he faces in a game against the Philadelphia Phillies. He fails to record a single out before he's pulled for relief pitcher Ken Crosby. Crosby proceeds to give up a hit to Johnny Oates as the Phillies defeated the Cubs 13-5.  
August 6 – The 56–53 Mets fire manager Yogi Berra and replace him with Roy McMillan.
August 9 – Davey Lopes steals his 32nd consecutive base for the Dodgers without being caught, in a 2–0 win over the Mets. This breaks the major league record set by Max Carey in 1922. Lou Brock gets his 2500th hit versus the San Diego Padres, a single in the 6th off of Dave Freisleben at Busch Stadium.
August 21 – Pitching brothers Rick Reuschel and Paul Reuschel combine to hurl the Cubs to a 7–0 victory over the Dodgers — the first time brothers have collaborated on a shutout. Paul takes over when Rick is forced to leave in the 7th inning because of a blister on his finger.
August 24 – In the second game of a doubleheader at Candlestick Park, Ed Halicki of the San Francisco Giants no-hits the New York Mets 6–0.

September
September 1 – Mets ace Tom Seaver shuts out the Pittsburgh Pirates 3–0, and reaches 200 strikeouts for a major league record eighth straight season.
September 2 – The San Francisco Giants' Johnny LeMaster sets a major league record by hitting an inside-the-park home run in his first at bat, during a 7–3 win over the Dodgers. Brian Downing, two years earlier, was the first major league player to hit his first homer inside-the-park, but not in his first at bat.
September 3 – On the final pitch of his Hall of Fame career, Cardinals great Bob Gibson gives up a grand slam to Pete LaCock. It will be LaCock's only bases-loaded homer of his career.
September 5 – Larry Andersen makes his major league debut for the Cleveland Indians. Anderson would go on to a 20-year career as a relief pitcher
September 7 – The Cincinnati Reds clinch the National League Western Division title, the earliest (by calendar day) a team has ever clinched their division in MLB history.
September 14 – The Boston Red Sox top the Milwaukee Brewers at Fenway Park, 8–6, as Brewers' 19-year-old shortstop Robin Yount breaks Mel Ott's 47-year-old record by playing in his 242nd game as a teenager.
September 16 – Rennie Stennett ties Wilbert Robinson's major league record, set June 10, 1892, by going 7-for-7 in a nine-inning game. He collects two hits each in the first and fifth innings, and scores five of his club's runs in a 22–0 massacre of the Cubs, a major league record for the biggest score in a shutout game in the 20th century. John Candelaria pockets the easy win, while Rick Reuschel is the loser.
September 18 – Released by the Minnesota Twins in January, Harmon Killebrew returns to Metropolitan Stadium a final time with his new team, the Kansas City Royals. He homers off Eddie Bane in the second inning—the final hit, run and home run of his career.
September 24 – In a scoreless game against the Chicago Cubs at Wrigley Field, Tom Seaver of the New York Mets has a no-hitter broken up with two out in the ninth on a Joe Wallis single. The Cubs win the game in the 11th inning 1–0, as Rick Monday scores on Bill Madlock's bases-loaded walk.
September 26 – New York Mets rookie Mike Vail strikes out seven times in a doubleheader against the Philadelphia Phillies, setting a National League record that still stands.
September 27 – The Yankees sweep a doubleheader from the Orioles, giving the Red Sox the AL East title.
September 28 – For the first time in major league history, four pitchers share in a no-hitter, as the Oakland Athletics shut down the California Angels, 5–0, on the final day of the season. Vida Blue, Glenn Abbott, Paul Lindblad and Rollie Fingers are the unique quartet.

October
October 21 – Delayed a day by rain, Game Six of the World Series will be among the most memorable.  Bernie Carbo of the Red Sox hits a three-run home run in the bottom of the eighth to tie the game.  Boston loads the bases with no outs in the ninth but cannot score until Carlton Fisk leads off the twelfth with his memorable walk-off home run, which deflects off the left field foul pole for a 7–6 victory to tie the series.
October 22 – At Fenway Park, the Cincinnati Reds win Game Seven of the World Series over the Boston Red Sox, 4–3. Cincinnati has come from behind in all four of their victories. Pete Rose is named the World Series MVP.

November
November 10 – The Kansas City Royals release slugger Harmon Killebrew, ending a 22-year career marked by 573 home runs, good for fifth place on the all-time list.
November 12 – Tom Seaver of the New York Mets wins his third Cy Young Award, after led the National League pitchers with 22 victories and 243 strikeouts while posting a 2.38 ERA.
November 19 – Joe Morgan of the Cincinnati Reds who led the Reds to their first World Championship since 1940 was named National League MVP.
November 20 – The San Francisco Giants fire manager Wes Westrum, coaxing Bill Rigney out of retirement to replace him
November 22 – The Cleveland Indians trade outfielder Oscar Gamble to the New York Yankees in exchange for pitcher Pat Dobson. 
November 26 – Boston Red Sox center fielder Fred Lynn becomes the first rookie ever to be named American League MVP. Lynn, who hit .331 with 21 home runs and 105 RBI, also posted league-leading figures in runs (103), doubles (47), and slugging (.566), helping Boston to the American League East title. He also won Rookie of the Year honors.

December
December 4 – Ted Turner enters a tentative purchase agreement to buy the Atlanta Braves.
December 10 – A deal to move the Chicago White Sox to Seattle, and the Oakland Athletics to Chicago's South Side, is nixed when Bill Veeck repurchases the White Sox and keeps them in Chicago.  Seattle would eventually be awarded with an expansion franchise, called the Mariners.
December 11 – The New York Yankees send starting pitcher Doc Medich to the Pittsburgh Pirates for pitchers Ken Brett and Dock Ellis and perennial All-Star second baseman Willie Randolph.
December 23 – Arbitrator Peter Seitz announces a landmark decision in favor of the Players' Association, making pitchers Andy Messersmith and Dave McNally free agents. Seitz is immediately fired by John Gaherin, chairman of the owners' Player Relations Committee. McNally, who retired on June 8, will not return to the majors, finishing with a 184–119 career record.

Births

January
January 1 – Fernando Tatís
January 2 – Jeff Suppan
January 8 – Geremi González
January 9 – Kiko Calero
January 9 – Ken Cloude
January 12 – Jorge Velandia
January 13 – Jason Childers
January 15 – Edwin Díaz
January 16 – Lee Gardner
January 17 – Brad Fullmer
January 17 – Scott Mullen
January 19 – Brian Mallette
January 19 – Fernando Seguignol
January 20 – David Eckstein
January 27 – Jason Conti
January 28 – Junior Spivey
January 29 – Miguel Ojeda

February
February 5 – Derrick Gibson
February 6 – Chad Allen
February 8 – Tony Mounce
February 9 – Vladimir Guerrero
February 10 – Hiroki Kuroda
February 14 – Dámaso Marte
February 15 – Rafael Medina
February 16 – Ángel Peña
February 18 – Ila Borders
February 18 – Chad Moeller
February 20 – Leo Estrella
February 20 – Liván Hernández
February 20 – Donzell McDonald
February 21 – Brandon Berger
February 23 – Dave Maurer
February 26 – Mark DeRosa
February 28 – Juan Moreno
February 28 – Ricky Stone

March
March 6 – Edgar Ramos
March 8 – Jesús Peña
March 9 – Rob Sasser
March 12 – Kevin Pickford
March 15 – Vladimir Núñez
March 15 – Dan Perkins
March 25 – Adrián Hernández
March 25 – Miguel Mejia
March 28 – Steve Sparks
March 28 – Julio Zuleta
March 29 – Marcus Jones
March 29 – Danny Kolb
March 31 – Tim Christman
March 31 – Ryan Rupe

April
April 2 – Hisanori Takahashi
April 3 – Koji Uehara
April 4 – Scott Rolen
April 5 – Domingo Guzmán
April 7 – Ronnie Belliard
April 8 – Jeremy Fikac
April 8 – Timo Pérez
April 9 – Talmadge Nunnari
April 10 – Mike Lincoln
April 11 – Todd Dunwoody
April 16 – Kelly Dransfeldt
April 19 – Brent Billingsley
April 19 – John LeRoy
April 21 – Carlos Castillo
April 21 – Aquilino López
April 25 – Jacque Jones
April 27 – Chris Carpenter
April 27 – Pedro Feliz
April 27 – Benj Sampson
April 28 – Jordan Zimmerman
April 29 – Rafael Betancourt
April 29 – Josh Booty

May
May 2 – Mark Johnson
May 3 – Gabe Molina
May 6 – Jim Chamblee
May 11 – Francisco Cordero
May 13 – Mickey Callaway
May 13 – Jack Cressend
May 15 – Graham Koonce
May 15 – Steve Woodard
May 17 – Scott Seabol
May 19 – Josh Paul
May 20 – Amaury García
May 20 – Luis García
May 25 – Adrian Johnson
May 25 – Randall Simon
May 26 – Travis Lee
May 29 – Sean Spencer
May 31 – Mac Suzuki

June
June 2 – Steve Rain
June 3 – José Molina
June 5 – Jason Green
June 6 – David Lamb
June 8 – Matt Perisho
June 10 – Freddy García
June 14 – Peter Munro
June 16 – José Nieves
June 17 – Mark Brownson
June 17 – Donnie Sadler
June 18 – Félix Heredia
June 19 – Willis Roberts
June 22 – Kenshin Kawakami
June 22 – Esteban Yan
June 25 – Kane Davis
June 26 – Jason Middlebrook
June 27 – Daryle Ward
June 28 – Richard Hidalgo
June 30 – Mike Judd

July
July 3 – Christian Parker
July 5 – Alberto Castillo
July 8 – David Moraga
July 14 – Tim Hudson
July 18 – Torii Hunter
July 22 – Scot Shields
July 24 – Bill Ortega
July 26 – Kevin Barker
July 27 – Shea Hillenbrand
July 27 – Alex Rodriguez
July 29 – Seth Greisinger
July 30 – Matt Erickson
July 30 – Oswaldo Mairena
July 31 – Randy Flores
July 31 – Gabe Kapler

August
August 2 – Joe Dillon
August 3 – Roosevelt Brown
August 4 – Eric Milton
August 6 – Víctor Zambrano
August 7 – Gerónimo Gil
August 7 – Édgar Rentería
August 8 – Chad Meyers
August 9 – Brian Fuentes
August 9 – Mike Lamb
August 12 – Luis Ordaz
August 14 – Eric Cammack
August 14 – McKay Christensen
August 14 – Scott Stewart
August 15 – Ben Ford
August 15 – Aaron Scheffer
August 16 – Michael Coleman
August 16 – Cho Jin-ho
August 19 – Juan Sosa
August 26 – Morgan Ensberg
August 26 – Troy Mattes
August 27 – Trent Durrington
August 29 – John Riedling
August 30 – Bucky Jacobsen

September
September 5 – Rod Barajas
September 5 – Randy Choate
September 6 – Derrek Lee
September 12 – Luis Castillo
September 12 – Mark Johnson
September 14 – George Lombard
September 15 – Javier Cardona
September 15 – Dan Smith
September 17 – Ryan Jensen
September 18 – Randy Williams
September 19 – Javier Valentín
September 20 – Yovanny Lara
September 21 – Doug Davis
September 22 – Luis García
September 22 – Danny Klassen
September 23 – Dave Elder
September 24 – Mario Encarnación
September 30 – Carlos Guillén

October
October 1 – Brandon Knight
October 3 – Scott Cassidy
October 3 – Mike Thompson
October 5 – Brandon Puffer
October 6 – Jeff Farnsworth
October 7 – Justin Brunette
October 8 – Andy Thompson
October 9 – Danny Mota
October 9 – J. J. Trujillo
October 10 – Plácido Polanco
October 17 – Héctor Almonte
October 18 – Alex Cora
October 19 – Horacio Estrada
October 21 – Toby Hall
October 23 – Todd Belitz
October 23 – Kazuo Matsui
October 23 – Todd Sears
October 26 – Ryan Bradley
October 29 – Karim García
October 29 – Gary Johnson
October 29 – Scott Randall
October 30 – Andy Dominique
October 30 – Marco Scutaro

November
November 2 – Paul Rigdon
November 10 – Edison Reynoso
November 16 – Julio Lugo
November 18 – Shawn Camp
November 18 – David Ortiz
November 18 – Matt Wise
November 19 – Clay Condrey
November 20 – J. D. Drew
November 21 – Brian Meadows
November 23 – Colin Porter

December
December 2 – Mark Kotsay
December 4 – Ed Yarnall
December 8 – Brian Barkley
December 10 – Joe Mays
December 11 – Nate Field
December 12 – Carlos Hernández
December 13 – Matt LeCroy
December 14 – Rodrigo López
December 15 – Edgard Clemente
December 17 – Brandon Villafuerte
December 19 – Russell Branyan
December 25 – Hideki Okajima
December 26 – Yoshinori Tateyama
December 27 – Jeff D'Amico
December 28 – B. J. Ryan
December 29 – Tom Jacquez
December 29 – Jason Pearson
December 29 – Jaret Wright
December 30 – Santiago Pérez
December 31 – Sam McConnell

Deaths

January
January 2 – Jim Poole, 79, first baseman in 283 games for 1925–1927 Philadelphia Athletics; active in Organized Baseball as a player or player-manager for 28 years between 1914 and 1946.
January 5 – Don Wilson, 29, Houston Astros' starting pitcher who had won 104 games for them since breaking into the majors September 29, 1966, and thrown two no-hitters (on June 18, 1967 against Atlanta, and May 1, 1969 against Cincinnati); National League All-Star (1971); in 1974, he had won 11 games and posted a 3.08 ERA in 204 innings pitched.
January 9 – Walton Cruise, 84, outfielder who played in 736 career games for the St. Louis Cardinals (1914 and 1916–1919) and Boston Braves (1919–1924).
January 9 – Curt Fullerton, 76, pitcher in 115 games for the Boston Red Sox (1921–1925 and 1933).
January 17 – Jim Canada, 63, first baseman for Birmingham, Jacksonville, Atlanta and Memphis of the Negro American League between 1937 and 1943.
January 21 – Pat Tobin, 58, pitcher who worked only one game (and one inning) in the majors, on August 21, 1941, as member of the Philadelphia Athletics.
January 23 – Clarence "Heinie" Mueller, 75, outfielder and first baseman who appeared in 693 career games over 11 years between 1920 and 1935 for the St. Louis Cardinals, New York Giants, Boston Braves and St. Louis Browns.
January 24 – Bobby Anderson, 75, second baseman/shortstop who appeared in 26 games for the 1920 Chicago Giants of the Negro National League.
January 24 – Doc Dudley, 81, first baseman for the St. Louis Giants/Stars of the Negro National League from 1920 to 1923.
January 26 – Astyanax Douglass, 77, catcher who played 11 games for the Cincinnati Reds over two seasons (1921 and 1925).

February
February 12 – Dutch Mele, 60, minor-league slugger who had a six-game "cup of coffee" with the 1937 Cincinnati Reds.
February 17 – George Twombly, 82, outfielder who appeared in 150 total games in five seasons spanning 1914 to 1919 for the Reds, Boston Braves and Washington Senators.
February 21 – Steve Filipowicz, 55, outfielder who played in 57 total games for the MLB New York Giants and Cincinnati Reds between 1944 and 1948; previously a running back with the NFL New York Giants in 1943.
February 27 – Otis Henry, 71, third baseman/outfielder who played in the Negro leagues with Memphis and Indianapolis between 1932 and 1937.

March
March 2 – Scat Metha, 61, infielder and pinch-runner who appeared in 26 games between April 22 and August 10 for the pennant-bound 1940 Detroit Tigers.
March 7 – Joe Benes, 74, infielder who played in ten games during May and June for 1931 St. Louis Cardinals.
March 10 – Clint Evans, 85, coach at the University of California from 1930 to 1954 who led team to the first College World Series title in 1947.
March 10 – Johnny Markham, 66, a Negro league pitcher for the Kansas City Monarchs and Birmingham Black Barons.
March 12 – Dick Lanahan, 63, southpaw pitcher who appeared in 56 career games for the Washington Senators (1935, 1937) and Pittsburgh Pirates (1940–1941).
March 13 – Red Marion, 60, outfielder in 18 games for the 1935 and 1943 Washington Senators, then a longtime minor-league manager; brother of Marty Marion.
March 17 – Diamond Pipkins, 67, left-hander who pitched for the Birmingham Black Barons and Cleveland Cubs between 1929 and 1942; led 1942 Negro American League hurlers in games won.
March 21 – Joe Medwick, 63, Hall of Fame left fielder and 10-time All-Star who in 1937 became the most recent National League player to win the triple crown, also winning the MVP; lifetime .324 hitter, who had six 100-RBI seasons for the St. Louis Cardinals; also played for Brooklyn Dodgers, New York Giants and Boston Braves during a 17-year (1932–1948) MLB career.
March 25 – Tommy Holmes, 71, sportswriter who covered the Brooklyn Dodgers from 1924 until the team's move to Los Angeles in 1958.
March 26 – Harley Young, 91, pitcher in 14 total games for the Pittsburgh Pirates and Boston Doves of the National League in 1908.
March 27 – Oscar Fuhr, 81, pitched in 63 contests for the Chicago Cubs and Boston Red Sox between 1921 and 1925.
March 28 – Hy Gunning, 86, first baseman who played four games for the 1911 Boston Red Sox.

April
April 3 – Merritt "Sugar" Cain, 67, pitcher for the Philadelphia Athletics (1932–1935), St. Louis Browns (1935–1936) and Chicago White Sox (1936–1938) who appeared in 178 career MLB games.
April 8 – Jim Peterson, 66, pitcher who hurled in 41 MLB games for the Philadelphia Athletics and Brooklyn Dodgers between 1931 and 1937.
April 11 – Fay Washington, 60, pitcher for St. Louis–New Orleans, Birmingham and Cincinnati–Indianapolis of the Negro American League between 1940 and 1945.
April 16 – Frank Wayenberg, 76, pitched in two games for the 1924 Cleveland Indians.
April 18 – Jack Burns, 67, first baseman for the St. Louis Browns and Detroit Tigers, 1930 to 1936, appearing in 890 games; later a coach and scout for the Boston Red Sox.
April 19 – Wes Kingdon, 74, infielder who played 20 years in the minor leagues and batted .324 in 18 games in his only MLB trial with the 1932 Washington Senators.
April 25 – Bruce Edwards, 51, catcher for the Brooklyn Dodgers (1946–1951), Chicago Cubs (1951–1952, 1954), Washington Senators (1955) and Cincinnati Redlegs (1956); two-time National League All-Star.

May
May 6 – Les Burke, 72, second baseman for the Detroit Tigers from 1923 to 1926.
May 10 – Harold Kaese, 66, sportswriter for the Boston Transcript and The Boston Globe from 1933 to 1973.
May 15 – Johnny Gooch, 77, catcher who played in 11 MLB seasons for the Pittsburgh Pirates (1921–1928), Brooklyn Robins (1928–1929), Cincinnati Reds (1929–1930) and Boston Red Sox (1933); member of 1925 World Series champions.
May 16 – Al Helfer, 63, play-by-play announcer for the Pittsburgh Pirates, Cincinnati Reds, Brooklyn Dodgers, New York Giants, New York Yankees, Philadelphia Phillies, Houston Colt .45s, Oakland Athletics, and Mutual's "Game of the Day" during a sportscasting career that stretched from 1933 to 1970.
May 17 – Sig Broskie, 64, catcher in 11 games for 1940 Boston Bees.
May 22 – Lefty Grove, 75, Hall of Fame pitcher for the Philadelphia Athletics and Boston Red Sox who became the second left-hander to win 300 games, leading AL in ERA nine times and in winning percentage five times, both records; won the pitching triple crown twice, also winning MVP in 1931 after 31–4 campaign; also led AL in strikeouts seven straight years.
May 25 – Bruce Hartford, 83, shortstop in eight games for the 1914 Cleveland Naps.
May 30 – Bert Cole, 78, left-handed pitcher who worked in 177 career games for the Detroit Tigers (1921–1925), Cleveland Indians (1925) and Chicago White Sox (1927).

June
June 2 – Spoke Emery, 78, outfielder in five games for 1925 Philadelphia Phillies; collected two hits in his three MLB at bats (.667).
June 9 – Ownie Carroll, 72, pitcher for the  Detroit Tigers, New York Yankees, Cincinnati Reds and Brooklyn Dodgers between 1925 and 1934, who later coached at Seton Hall University for 25 years.
June 16 – Clint Courtney, 48, catcher for five American League teams between 1951 and 1961 and the first major leaguer at his position to wear eyeglasses; manager of Triple-A Richmond Braves at the time of his death.
June 17 – Sid Gordon, 57, All-Star left fielder and third baseman, primarily for the New York Giants (1941–1943, 1946–1949 and 1955) and Boston and Milwaukee Braves (1950–1953), who had five 20-HR seasons.
June 23 – Marty Callaghan, 75, outfielder who appeared in 295 career games for the Chicago Cubs (1922–1923) and Cincinnati Reds (1926 and 1928).
June 28 – Audrey Bleiler, 42, infielder for two All-American Girls Professional Baseball League champion teams.

July
July 5 – Joe Kiefer, 75, pitcher in 15 games for the Chicago White Sox (1920) and Boston Red Sox (1925–1926).
July 18 – Ted Wingfield, 75, pitcher who played in 113 games from 1923 to 1927 for the Washington Senators and Boston Red Sox.
July 23 – Art Mills, 72, pitcher in 19 games for the 1927–1928 Boston Braves; coach for the Detroit Tigers from 1944–1948, including service on 1945 World Series champion.
July 27 – Fred Sherry, 86, pitcher who went 0–4 (4.30 ERA) in ten games for the 1911 Washington Senators.
July 31 – Max Flack, 85, right fielder for the Chicago Whales of the Federal League (1914–1915), Chicago Cubs (1916–1922) and St. Louis Cardinals (1922–1925) who batted over .300 three times.

August
August 5 – Bill Morrell, 82, pitcher for the 1926 Washington Senators and 1930–1931 New York Giants who worked in 48 career games.
August 11 – Rollin Cook, 84, pitcher who appeared in five contests for the 1915 St. Louis Browns.
August 12 – Lew Riggs, 65, third baseman for St. Louis Cardinals (1934), Cincinnati Reds (1935–1940) and Brooklyn Dodgers (1941–1942 and 1946); 1936 National League All-Star and member of 1940 World Series champions.
August 20 – Daniel Canónico, 59, pitcher who led the Venezuelan team to the 1941 Amateur World Series title, winning five of the team's games including the series-tying and deciding games against Cuba.
August 20 – Jake Miller, 77, pitched in an even 200 games over nine seasons in the American League, eight of them for the Cleveland Indians (1924–1931).
August 26 – Eddie Snead, 65, pitcher who won three of four decisions for the 1940 Birmingham Black Barons of the Negro American League.

September
September 3 – Irv Medlinger, 48, left-handed relief pitcher who got into nine games for the 1949 and 1951 St. Louis Browns.
September 9 – Ken Jungels, 59, relief pitcher who appeared in 25 total games over five seasons between 1937 and 1942 for the Cleveland Indians and Pittsburgh Pirates.
September 10 – Lance Richbourg, 77, right fielder who played 629 of his 698 MLB games for the Boston Braves (1927–1931); batted .308 lifetime.
September 12 – Augie Johns, 76, southpaw who pitched in 36 games for the 1926–1927 Detroit Tigers.
September 28 – Moose Solters, 69, left fielder with four AL teams between 1934 and 1943 who batted .300 and drove in over 100 runs three times, before his eyesight gradually failed after he was hit with a ball during a 1941 warmup.
September 29 – Casey Stengel, 85, Hall of Fame manager who won a record ten pennants (tied with John McGraw) in 12 seasons leading the Yankees (1949–1960), capturing seven World Series titles (tied with Joe McCarthy); also managed Dodgers, Braves and Mets, applying his trademark humor to the Mets in their woeful first season; in 25 years as an MLB manager, posted a record of 1,899–1,835 (.509); in his playing days, an outfielder for five NL clubs from 1912 to 1925; batted .393 in 28 World Series at bats (1916, 1922, 1923), hitting two game-winning home runs for the New York Giants (against the Yankees) in the 1923 Fall Classic.

October
October 1 – Larry MacPhail, 85, Hall of Fame executive who introduced night games, plane travel and pensions to the major leagues while running the Cincinnati Reds (1933–1936), Brooklyn Dodgers (1938–1942) and New York Yankees (1945–1947); won 1941 National League pennant in Brooklyn and 1947 World Series with Yankees, then left baseball; father of Lee, also a Hall of Fame executive, and grandfather of Andy MacPhail, high-level executive for multiple teams between 1986 and 2020.
October 3 – Elmer Knetzer, 90, pitcher who won 38 games for the Pittsburgh Rebels of the "outlaw" Federal League in 1914–1915; also pitched for Brooklyn, Boston and Cincinnati of the National League from 1909–1912 and 1916–1917.
October 4 – Joan Whitney Payson, 72, founding principal owner of the New York Mets from 1961 until her death; former stockholder in New York Giants who, in 1957, voted against their transfer to San Francisco.
October 13 – Swede Risberg, 81, shortstop for the 1917–1920 Chicago White Sox, and member of 1917 world champions and 1919 AL champions; last survivor among the eight players barred from baseball for their involvement in the Black Sox Scandal.
October 15 – Mickey Grasso, 55, catcher and World War II POW who resumed his baseball career in 1946; played in 322 MLB games for the Washington Senators (1950–1953), Cleveland Indians (1954) and New York Giants (1946 and 1955).
October 19 – Hod Kibbie, 72, second baseman and shortstop who had an 11-game stint with the 1925 Boston Braves.

November
November 8 – Les Backman, 87, right-hander who pitched in 47 games for the 1909 and 1910 St. Louis Cardinals.
November 8 – Vern Morgan, 47, third baseman who appeared in 31 games for the 1954–1955 Chicago Cubs; coach for the Minnesota Twins from 1969 until his death.
November 8 – Ray Shepardson, 78, catcher in three games for 1924 St. Louis Cardinals.
November 14 – Garland Buckeye, 78, southpaw pitcher who appeared in 108 MLB games between 1918 and 1928, 106 of them for the 1925–1928 Cleveland Indians.
November 25 – Red Sheridan, 79, infielder in five games for the Brooklyn Robins (1918, 1920).
November 26 – Laymon Yokely, 69, stalwart Negro leagues pitcher between 1926 and 1946, notably for the Baltimore Black Sox; led Eastern Colored League in victories, strikeouts, innings pitched and complete games in 1928; won 17 games in 1929.
November 27 – Eddie Dwight, 70, outfielder/second baseman who played for three Negro leagues teams, notably the Kansas City Monarchs, between 1925 and 1937.
November 27 – Gene Osborn, 53, play-by-play announcer who described games for the Mutual Network "Game of the Day" and the Detroit Tigers, Pittsburgh Pirates, Chicago White Sox and Kansas City Royals between 1959 and 1975.
November – Claudio Manela, 81, first Filipino to play in major leagues; a left-hander who pitched in 21 games for the 1921 Cuban Stars of the Negro National League.

December
December 1 – Nellie Fox, 47, Hall of  Fame second baseman, 12-time All-Star for the Chicago White Sox (1950–1963) who formed half of a spectacular middle infield with Luis Aparicio; batted .300 six times, led AL in hits four times, and was 1959 MVP; overall played in 19 MLB seasons (1947–1965) with Philadelphia Athletics, White Sox and Houston Astros, and made 2,663 hits.
December 1 – Dave Koslo, 55, left-handed pitcher who won over 90 games for the New York Giants (1941–1942 and 1946–1953), missing 1943–1945 seasons due to wartime service; started and won Game 1 of the 1951 World Series.  
December 8 – Fred Blackwell, 84, reserve catcher for the 1917–1919 Pittsburgh Pirates.
December 8 – Johnny Couch, 84, pitcher for Detroit Tigers (1917), Cincinnati Reds (1922–1923) and Philadelphia Phillies (1923–1925) who worked in 147 career games.
December 9 – Jeff Heath, 60, Canadian-born, two-time All-Star left fielder (1941 and 1943) with the Cleveland Indians (1936–1945); also played with Washington Senators (1946), St. Louis Browns (1946–1947) and Boston Braves (1948–1949); led American League in triples twice (1938, 1941); helped lead Boston to 1948 National League pennant, but broke his ankle late in September and missed 1948 World Series, played against Cleveland; later a broadcaster for Seattle of the Pacific Coast League; posthumously elected to Canadian Baseball Hall of Fame (1988).
December 12 – Julie Wera, 75, backup third baseman who played in 38 games as a member of the 1927 World Series champion New York Yankees.
December 13 – Alex Herman, 76, Negro leagues outfielder during the 1920s and 1930s; Tuskegee Institute graduate who became the first African-American elected to office in Alabama since Reconstruction; in 1925, while a player, he recommended that his club sign a young Satchel Paige, kick-starting Paige's long, Hall of Fame career.
December 15 – Buster Chatham, 73, third baseman-shortstop in 129 games for Boston Braves during 1930 and 1931; longtime scout and minor-league manager.
December 17 – Kerby Farrell, 62, manager of the 1957 Cleveland Indians; first baseman and left-handed pitcher in 188 games for 1943 Boston Braves and 1945 Chicago White Sox; coach for White Sox and Indians between 1966 and 1971; won three Minor League Manager of the Year awards during his long career as a skipper in minors.
December 23 – Rae Blaemire, 64, catcher in two games for 1941 New York Giants.
December 23 – Jim McGlothlin, 32, pitcher for the California Angels (1965–1969), Cincinnati Reds (1970–1973) and Chicago White Sox (1973); American League All-Star (1967); appeared in 1970 and 1972 World Series.
December 24 – Russ Lyon, 62, catcher who appeared in seven games with the 1944 Cleveland Indians.
December 27 – Lou Lowdermilk, 88, left-handed pitcher who played in 20 career games for the 1911–1912 St. Louis Cardinals.

References